Hans Juergen Mueh (born January 8, 1944) was the director of athletics at the United States Air Force Academy, Colorado Springs, Colorado, serving in that position from 2004 until January 2015. Prior to becoming the Director of Athletics for the USAF, Dr. Mueh served as permanent professor and head of the Department of Chemistry, and Vice Dean of Faculty at the Academy.

Background
Mueh was born in Celle, Germany and emigrated to the United States in 1951. He graduated from the U.S. Air Force Academy in 1966. He served as an intelligence officer in Saigon, South Vietnam, and at Nakhon Phanom Royal Thai Air Force Base, Thailand. In 1976, he was recognized as a distinguished graduate after completing a Doctor of Philosophy in chemistry at the University of Wisconsin, and in 1977 he was assigned to the U.S. Air Force Academy as an associate professor in chemistry. Dr. Mueh then served as special assistant for technical matters at the Defense Intelligence Agency before returning to the Air Force Academy where he served as head of the Department of Chemistry and Vice Dean of the Faculty. He retired from the Air Force in 2004 and became the ninth Director of Athletics at the academy.

Education
1966 Bachelor of Science, chemistry, U.S. Air Force Academy, Colorado Springs, Colo.
1970 Master of Science, chemistry, University of Wisconsin, Madison
1976 Doctor of Philosophy, chemistry, University of Wisconsin, Madison (distinguished graduate)

Career chronology
 1966–1967, intelligence officer trainee, Air Force Air Intelligence Training Center, Colorado Springs, Colo.
 1967–1969, intelligence analyst, Headquarters Tactical Air Command, Langley AFB, Va.
 1969–1970, graduate student, University of Wisconsin, Madison
 1970–1972, instructor, Department of Chemistry, U.S. Air Force Academy, Colorado Springs, Colo.
 1972–1973, intelligence officer, Saigon, South Vietnam, and Nakhon Phanom Royal Thai Air Force Base, Thailand
 1973–1976, doctoral student, University of Wisconsin, Madison
 1977–1981, associate professor, Department of Chemistry, U.S. Air Force Academy, Colorado Springs, Colo.
 1981–1985, tenure associate professor, later, tenure professor, Department of Chemistry, U.S. Air Force Academy, Colorado Springs, Colo.
 1985–1986, special assistant for technical matters, Defense Intelligence Agency, the Pentagon, Washington, D.C.
 1986–2002, acting Head, later, permanent professor and Head, Department of Chemistry, U.S. Air Force Academy, Colorado Springs, Colo.
 2002–2004, Vice Dean of Faculty, U.S. Air Force Academy, Colorado Springs, Colo.
 2004–2015, Athletic Director, U.S. Air Force Academy, Colorado Springs, Colo.

Awards and decorations
Legion of Merit
Defense Meritorious Service Medal
Meritorious Service Medal with oak leaf cluster
Joint Service Commendation Medal
Air Force Commendation Medal with oak leaf cluster
Army Achievement Medal

Other achievements
 1987–1989, officer representative, U.S. Air Force Academy men's intercollegiate golf team
 1990–1995, officer representative, U.S. Air Force Academy football team
 1996–present, NCAA Faculty Athletics Representative

References

External links

 

1944 births
Living people
Air Force Falcons athletic directors
Air Force Falcons men's soccer players
United States Air Force Academy faculty
United States Air Force officers
University of Wisconsin–Madison College of Letters and Science alumni
Recipients of the Legion of Merit
People from Celle
German emigrants to the United States
21st-century American chemists
United States Air Force Academy alumni
American intelligence analysts
Association footballers not categorized by position
Association football players not categorized by nationality